Lago di Val Viola (Lagh da Val Viola) is a lake in the Grisons, Switzerland. The lake is located near Lago di Saoseo, in the Poschiavo region.

See also
List of mountain lakes of Switzerland

References

Val Viola
Val Viola
Val da Camp
Poschiavo